The Government of the Islamic Republic of Iran (known simply as Neẓām among its supporters) is the ruling state and current political system in Iran, in power since the Islamic revolution and fall of the Pahlavi dynasty in 1979.

Its constitution, adopted by an ex post facto referendum, uses separation of powers model with Executive, Legislative, and Judicial systems, while the Supreme Leader is the country's head of state and commander-in-chief of the armed forces.

It is currently one of the three governments using the title Islamic republic.

Creation

The Islamic Republic of Iran was created shortly after the Islamic Revolution. The first major demonstrations with the intent to overthrow the Shah Mohammad Reza Pahlavi began in January 1978, with a new, Islam-based,  theocratic Constitution being approved in December 1979, ending the monarchy. The Shah left Iran for exile in January 1979 after large strikes and demonstrations against him and his regime paralyzed the country. Ayatollah Khomeini would return in February of the same year after a long period of exile, greeted in the capital of Tehran by several million Iranians. The final collapse of the Pahlavi dynasty occurred shortly after on February 11 when Iran's military declared itself officially "neutral" after guerrillas and rebel troops overwhelmed forces loyal to the Shah in street fights throughout the country.

After the victory of the Islamic Revolution, a referendum was held by Interim Government of Iran on the 30th and 31 March 1979 (10 and 11 Farvardin 1358), asking people to vote either Yes or No to an Islamic Republic. The results of the referendum were announced soon after by Ayatollah Khomeini on April 2, 1979, with 98.2 percent of the Iranian citizens voting in favor of an Islamic Republic.

Constitution

On 2–3 December 1979, the Constitution of the Islamic Republic of Iran was ratified by a popular referendum. In this referendum, 99.5 present of Iranian voters approved the constitution. Ten years later, in the summer of 1989, Iranian voters would approve a set of amendments to the Constitution of 1979 in another referendum. The constitution has been called a "hybrid" of "theocratic and democratic elements". While Articles 1 and 2 vest sovereignty in God, Article 6 "mandates popular elections for the presidency and the Majlis, or parliament." However, all democratic procedures and rights are subordinate to the Guardian Council and the Supreme Leader, whose powers are spelled out in Chapter Eight (Articles 107–112).

Principles

The Government of the Islamic Republic of Iran is officially a theocratic republic. Article 2 of the Constitution explains the principles of the government of the Islamic Republic of Iran:

Political structure

Leadership

The Supreme Leader of the Islamic Republic of Iran, called the Supreme Leadership Authority officially in Iran. This post was established by Article 5 of the Constitution of the Islamic Republic of Iran in accordance with the concept of the Guardianship of the Islamic Jurist. This post is a life tenure post. According to article 110 of the constitution, the Supreme Leader delineates the general policies of the Islamic Republic. Article 109 is about the Leadership Qualifications and Article 110 mentions to Functions and duties of the Supreme Leader. According to this Article he is the commander-in-chief of the Armed Forces. Also according to Article 57 the Legislature, the Executive and the Judiciary system shall operate under the superintendence of Supreme leader. The Islamic Republic has had two Supreme Leaders: Ayatollah Ruhollah Khomeini, who held the position from Iranian revolution in 1979 until his death in 1989, and Ayatollah Ali Khamenei, who has held the position since Khomeini's death.

Legislature

The Legislature of the Islamic Republic of Iran has two parts: the Islamic Consultative Assembly and the Guardian Council. The Articles 62-99 are about the Legislature of the Islamic Republic of Iran.

Consultative Assembly

Articles 62-90 of the Constitution of the Islamic Republic of Iran are about the Islamic Consultative Assembly. In Article 71, it is mentioned that the Islamic Consultative Assembly can establish laws on all matters, within the limits of its competence as laid down in the Constitution. According to Article 62, the Islamic consultative Assembly is constituted by the representatives of the people elected directly and by secret ballot. Article 64 notes that there are to be two hundred seventy members of the Islamic Consultative Assembly which, keeping in view the human, political, geographic and other similar factors, may increase by not more than twenty for each ten-year period from the date of the national referendum of the year 1368 of the solar Islamic calendar. The Parliament currently has 290 representatives, changed from the previous 272 seats since the 18 February 2000 election. The most recent election took place on 26 February 2016 and the new parliament was opened on 28 May 2016.

Guardian Council

The Guardian Council is a part of the legislature that acts in many ways as an upper house to the Consultative Assembly. This council reviews the legislation by the Consultative Assembly to examine its compatibility with Islam and the Constitution.

Articles 91-99 are about the Guardian Council. According to article 91, it has 12 members, Half its members are faqihs that are chosen by the Supreme Leader and the other six members are jurists who are elected by the Islamic Consultative Assembly from among the Muslim jurists nominated-by the Chief Justice of Iran.

Executive

President

In the Islamic Republic of Iran, President is the second person of government and the head of government. The President is the highest nominally popularly elected official in Iran, although the President answers to the Supreme Leader of Iran, who functions as the country's head of state. Chapter 9 (Articles 133–142) of the Constitution of the Islamic Republic of Iran sets forth the qualifications for presidential candidates and procedures for election, as well as the President's powers and responsibilities as "functions of the executive". These include signing treaties and other agreements with foreign countries and international organizations; administering national planning, budget, and state employment affairs; and appointing ministers subject to the approval of Parliament.

According to article 114 the President of Iran is elected for a four-year term by the direct vote of the people and may not serve for more than two consecutive terms or more than 8 years.

The current President of Iran is Ebrahim Raisi, who assumed office on August, 2021, after the 2021 Iranian presidential election. He succeeded Hassan Rouhani, who served 8 years in office from 2013 to 2021.

Vice president

Cabinet

Judicial system

The judiciary of the Islamic Republic of Iran is an independent power, the protector of the rights of the individual and society, responsible for the implementation of justice, and entrusted with the following duties:

1.investigating and passing judgement on grievances, violations of rights, and complaints; the resolving of litigation; the settling of disputes; and the taking of all necessary decisions and measures in probate matters as the law may determine;

2.restoring public rights and promoting justice and legitimate freedoms;

3.supervising the proper enforcement of laws;

4.uncovering crimes; prosecuting, punishing, and chastising criminals; and enacting the penalties and provisions of the Islamic penal code;

5.taking suitable measures to prevent the occurrence of crime and to reform criminals. (Article 156 of Constitution)

Other institutions

Assembly of Experts

Assembly of Experts or Assembly of Experts of the Leadership is a deliberative body of eighty eight (88) Mujtahids. The members are elected by direct public voting for eight years.

According to article 107, 109 and 111 the duties of this assembly are electing and removing the Supreme Leader of Iran.

The last voting took place on 26 February 2016. The new assembly was opened on 24 May 2016 and selected Ahmad Jannati as chairman of the Fifth Assembly.

Expediency Discernment Council

The Expediency Discernment Council is an administrative assembly appointed by the Supreme Leader and was created upon the revision to the Constitution of the Islamic Republic of Iran on 6 February 1988. According to article 112 of Constitution It was originally set up to resolve differences or conflicts between the Consultative Assembly and the Guardian Council, but "its true power lies more in its advisory role to the Supreme Leader."

Members of the council are chosen by the Supreme Leader every five years.

Sadiq Amoli Larijani is the chairman of this council.

Councils of Iran

According to article 7 the city and village Councils are one of the decision-making and administrative organs of the country.
The chapter seven (article 100–106) of Iran's constitution is about these local Councils. According to article 100: In order to expedite social, economic, development, public health, cultural, and educational programmes and facilitate other affairs relating to public welfare with the cooperation of the people according to local needs, the administration of each village, division, city, municipality, and province will be supervised by a council to be named the Village, Division, City, Municipality, or Provincial Council. Members of each of these councils will be elected by the people of the locality in question. Qualifications for the eligibility of electors and candidates for these councils, as well as their functions and powers, the mode of election, the jurisdiction of these councils, the hierarchy of their authority, will be determined by law, in such a way as to preserve national unity, territorial integrity, the system of the Islamic Republic, and the sovereignty of the central government.

Islamic Republic of Iran Broadcasting

The Islamic Republic of Iran Broadcasting (IRIB) according to Constitution is the only radio and television services in Iran. According to article 175 of Constitution the appointment and dismissal of the head of the Islamic Republic of Iran Broadcasting rests with the Leader. A council consisting of two representatives each of the President, the head of the judiciary branch and the Islamic Consultative Assembly shall supervise the functioning of this organization.

Armed forces

General Staff of Armed Forces of the Islamic Republic of Iran

The Supreme Leader appoints General staff of Armed forces of the Islamic Republic of Iran which is the highest military body in Iran, with an aim to implement policy, monitor and coordinate activities within Armed Forces of the Islamic Republic of Iran. Major general Mohammad Hossein Bagheri is the current chief of this staff.

Islamic Republic of Iran Army

The Islamic Republic of Iran Army is the "conventional military of Iran" and part of Armed Forces of the Islamic Republic of Iran. The army is tasked to protect the territorial integrity of Iranian state from external and internal threats and to project power. According to article 143 of Constitution the Army of the Islamic Republic of Iran is responsible for guarding the independence and territorial integrity of the country, as well as the order of the Islamic Republic. Artesh has its own Joint Staff which coordinates its four separate service branches: Ground Forces, Air Force, Navy and Air Defense Base. The current chief of Army is MG Abdolrahim Mousavi.

Islamic Revolution Guard Corps

The Islamic Revolution Guard Corps (Sepah) is a branch of Iran's Armed Forces, established after the Islamic revolution on 5 May 1979. Article 150 says about Sepah that The Islamic Revolution Guards Corps, organized in the early days of the triumph of the Revolution, is to be maintained so that it may continue in its role of guarding the Revolution and its achievements. MG Hossain Salami is the current commander of the Islamic Revolution Guard Corps.

Law Enforcement Force of the Islamic Republic of Iran

Law Enforcement Force of the Islamic Republic of Iran is the uniformed police force in Iran. It was established in 1992 by merging the Shahrbani, Gendarmerie and Committee of Iran into a single force, it has more than 60,000 police personnel served under the Ministry of Interior, including border patrol personnel. 
Brigadier General Hossein Ashtari is the current commander of this force.

Islamic political culture
It is said that there are attempts to incorporate modern political and social concepts into Islamic canon since 1950. The attempt was a reaction to the secular political discourse namely Marxism, liberalism and nationalism. However, we could observe the great influence of western culture in Iran after a coup d'état in 1953. Following the death of Ayatollah Boroujerdi, some of the scholars like Murtaza Mutahhari, Muhammad Beheshti and Muhmud Talighani found new opportunity to change the condition. Before them, Boroujerdi considered as conservative Marja. They try to reforms the conditions after the death of ayatollah. They presented their arguments by rendering lectures in 1960 and 1963 in Tehran. The result of the lectures was the book of An inquiry into principles of Mar’jaiyat. Some of the major issues are to the government in Islam, the need for the clergy's independent financial organization, Islam as a way of life, advising and guiding youth and necessity of being community. Allameh Tabatabei refers to velayat as a political philosophy for Shia and velayat faqih for Shia community. There are also other attempts to formulate new attitude of Islam such as the publication of three volumes of Maktab Tashayyo.  Also somebodies believe that it is indispensable to revive the religious gathered in Hoseyniyeh-e-Ershad.

See also 

 Ayatollah Ruhollah Khomeini
 Politics of Iran (links to ministries and government agencies)
 Human rights in the Islamic Republic of Iran

References

External links

 
Government of Iran
Economy of Iran
Organizations that oppose LGBT rights
Political terminology of Iran
Government of the Islamic Republic of Iran